Long Island is a volcanic island in Papua New Guinea. It is located north of the island of New Guinea, separated from it by the Vitiaz Strait.

Geography
Two stratovolcanoes are located on the island: Mount Reaumur and Cerisy Peak. The summit of the volcanic complex collapsed during at least three major explosive eruptions, about 16,000, 4000, and 300 years ago. These produced a large caldera 10 x 12.5 km in size, now filled with a freshwater crater lake, Lake Wisdom. In 1953-1954 and 1968, volcanic activity created Motmot Island on the crater lake, 200 x 200 m in size. The 1660 eruption was one of the largest in Papua New Guinea's recent history with an estimated air-fall volume in excess of 11 cu km, comparable to the 1991 eruption of Mount Pinatubo, but the Global Volcanism Program gives a much higher estimate of 30 cu km. This cataclysmic event prompted legends of a "Time of Darkness". The most recent (and a smaller) eruption occurred in 1993.

The crater holds water at a much higher level than the surrounding sea water. Aircraft surveying inside the crater with radar altimeters estimate the height of the water to be approximately 600-700' higher than the water outside suggesting there is no channel or means of water transfer to Lake Wisdom.

History
The first sighting by Europeans of Long Island was by the Spanish navigator Iñigo Órtiz de Retes on 12 August 1545 when on board of the carrack San Juan he tried to return from Tidore to New Spain.

Long Island was charted in 1643 by Abel Tasman but he mistook it for part of the New Guinea mainland.

Long Island was utilised as a barge staging area by the Imperial Japanese during World War II. On December 26, 1943, D Company of the 592d Engineer Boat and Shore Regiment, 2d Engineer Special Brigade, US Army, landed on Long Island to prepare a radar station as part of the Battle of Cape Gloucester. The Royal Australian Air Force No. 338 Radar Station was set up at Matfum Point and became operational on April 6, 1944, and was to remain until March 1945.

See also
 List of volcanoes in Papua New Guinea
 Timeline of volcanism on Earth

References

External links 
 

Islands of Papua New Guinea
Stratovolcanoes of Papua New Guinea
Active volcanoes
Calderas of Papua New Guinea
Volcanic crater lakes
17th-century volcanic events
Complex volcanoes
VEI-6 volcanoes
Pleistocene calderas
Holocene calderas
Pleistocene stratovolcanoes
Holocene stratovolcanoes